Cecos is one of eleven parishes (administrative divisions) in the municipality of Ibias, within the province and autonomous community of Asturias, in northern Spain.

Villages and hamlets
Bustelo
Boiro 
Carbueiro
Cadagayoso 
Cecos 
Centanales 
Folgueiras de Boiro 
Lagüeiro 
Pousadoiro 
Mergulleira 
San Esteban 
El Rellán
Vilamayor
Vilarcebulín

References

Parishes in Ibias